William H. Flett (May 10, 1856 – September 5, 1911) was an American attorney and politician who served as a member of the Wisconsin State Assembly.

Early life and education 
Born in the town of Somers, Wisconsin, Flett attended local public schools. He then went to University of Wisconsin and worked as a teacher. He graduated from the University of Wisconsin Law School.

Career 
In 1885, Flett moved to Merrill, Wisconsin and practiced law. Flett served as Merrill city attorney and was involved with the Republican Party. In 1897, Flett served in the Wisconsin State Assembly. In 1904, Flett served on the Wisconsin Commission for the Louisiana Purchase Exposition in St. Louis, Missouri.

Death 
Flett moved to Seattle, Washington, where he died in 1911.

Notes

External links

1856 births
1911 deaths
People from Somers, Wisconsin
People from Merrill, Wisconsin
Politicians from Seattle
University of Wisconsin–Madison alumni
University of Wisconsin Law School alumni
Wisconsin lawyers
Republican Party members of the Wisconsin State Assembly
19th-century American lawyers